G18 may refer to:

Roads 
 G-18 (Michigan county highway)
 County Route G18 (California)
 G18 Rongcheng–Wuhai Expressway, in China

Vehicles 
 , an Auk-class minesweeper of the Mexican Navy
 Chase G-18, an American combat glider
 EMD G18, an American diesel locomotive
 Fiat G.18, an Italian airliner
 , a Weapon-class destroyer of the Royal Navy

Other uses 
 Glock 18, an automatic handgun
 Prince G-18, a car engine
 Xplore G18, a cellular phone